The 2020–21 Georgia Tech Yellow Jackets men's basketball team represented the Georgia Institute of Technology during the 2020–21 NCAA Division I men's basketball season. They were led by fifth-year head coach Josh Pastner and played their home games at Hank McCamish Pavilion as members of the Atlantic Coast Conference. In a season limited due to the ongoing COVID-19 pandemic, the Yellow Jackets finished the season 17–9, 11–6 in ACC play to finish in fourth place. They defeated Miami in the quarterfinals of the ACC tournament and advanced to the championship game after Virginia was forced to withdraw from the tournament after a positive COVID-19 test. They defeated Florida State to win the tournament championship and received the conference's automatic bid to the NCAA tournament as the No. 9 seed in the Midwest region. They lost in the first round to Loyola. It was the first time since 2010 that the Yellow Jackets had participated in the NCAA Tournament, and their first ACC Championship since 1993.

Previous season
The Yellow Jackets finished the 2019–20 season 17–14, 11–9 in ACC play to finish in fifth place. The team was banned from postseason play, including the conference tournament, due to NCAA rules violations.

Offseason

Departures

Incoming transfers

2020 recruiting class

Roster

Schedule and results

|-
!colspan=9 style=|Regular season

|-
!colspan=12 style=| ACC tournament

|-
!colspan=12 style=| NCAA tournament

Source

Rankings

*AP does not release post-NCAA Tournament rankings

References

Georgia Tech Yellow Jackets men's basketball seasons
Georgia Tech
2020 in sports in Georgia (U.S. state)
2021 in sports in Georgia (U.S. state)
Georgia Tech